Hans-Joachim Hessler (German: Heßler, born  in Recklinghausen) is a German composer, musician and musicologist. Today, he lives in Duisburg and Diemelsee. As a contemporary composer, he attributes his work in writing and composition to the epoch of musical postmodernism.

Life 
He studied music theory at the University of Münster and then, from 1990 to 1997, school music and German literature at today's Technical University of Dortmund. He received his education in art from, among others, Werner Seiss and Bob Degen, in the organ from, among others, Karl Weyers and Thomas Gabriel, and in composition from, among others, Heribert Buchholz and Thomas Stanko. In 2008, he received the academic degree of Doctor of Philosophy from the University of Music and Performing Arts, Graz.

Work 
Poly-stylistics and boundary crossings of all kinds are a fundamental attribute of Hessler's work.

Much of Hessler's work appears to be influenced by the philosophical writings of the postmodern thinker Jean-François Lyotard; for instance his chamber music pieces "" [compulsion for actualisation] and "" [system for sound regulation 189], which deal in particular with the event philosophy of Lyotard, as well as the orchestra series "", which are dedicated to his main philosophical work of the same title.

From the beginning of his career onwards, Hessler has been placing particular emphasis on musical breaks and the configuration of transitions between the different genres and styles. During the mid-1980s, for example, the program of the Flax-Trio, which Hessler belonged to as a formative member, pianist and keyboarder, reads: "With pleasure, the boundaries between completely different musical styles are torn down; these are then decomposed into single pieces, absorbed and brought back to the listener in entirely new forms." This compositional technique, which Hessler in leaning on Frank Zappa calls "conceptual discontinuity", significantly marks his producing until today.

Writing (selection) 
How close theory and practice are, can be seen in Hessler's transfer of the theory of intensities onto the practice of music in his book on Jean-François Lyotard. The theory of intensities implies that, in the case of conflict between two discourses, or rather, during the transition from one discourse to the other, intensive feelings occur. The book carries the title .

The fact that not only Pierre Boulez, but also Madonna need to be considered under the heading of contemporary music, becomes clear in Hessler's posthistorical considerations in relation to the "Disappearance of music" (orig. "")

In his comprehensive treatise "", Hessler shows among others that, according to his view, the musician and composer Charles Mingus can also be subsumed under the ideal type of "conceptual discontinuity".

Political commitment 
Hessler interprets one of the most significant key texts on the discussion around postmodernism "" (Cross the border, close the trench!) by Leslie Fiedler in the sense of an education mandate for artists and as a negotiated agreement of a convinced democrat to contribute, also in the area of contemporary music, to the overcoming of elitist and mass culture.

Catalogue of works (selection)

Piano works 
  (1992)
  (1992)
  [Claude and the uneven beat] (1994)
  (1992)
 S.L.Y. (1994)
  (1999)
  [10 Latin-American compositions] (2003)
 10 Well-Tempered Appearances of the Blues (2003)

Organ works 
 A.C. D.E.B. (2006)
 Dance Macabre (2003)
 D.S.C.A. (2009)
  [Evocations No. 1 & No. 2] (1995)
 G.F. H.A.E. (2006)
  [Impressions No. 1 & No. 2] (1995)
  [Irritations 1] (2003)
  [Erasings] (2000)

Chamber music 
  [Compulsion for actualisation for piano, double bass and violin] (1997)
  [Please leave standing for double bass and bass clarinet] (1987)
  [CHANFLAX for double bass, bass clarinet and piano] (1988)
  [Continuum contra Punctum for piano, double bass, violin and marimbaphone] (1997)
  [The storybook moon for voice and piano] (1994)
  [An empty dream of happiness for voice, soprano saxophone and piano] (1994)
  [Awakening for voice, soprano saxophone and piano] (1992)
  [Keep smiling for double bass, bass clarinet and piano] (1987)
 Methexis I–VII for 3 violins, double bass, 2 trombones, trumpet, flute, clarinet, vibraphone, timbal, accordion, piano and voice (1994)
  [Six discourses for violin solo] (1997)
  [Dance in the bird cage No. 2 (Satirical Dance) for string quartet with side instruments] (2004)
  [Sound regulation system 189 for piano, double bass, violin and merimbaphone] (1997)

Orchestra works 
 HALB! (Hommage à Leonard Bernstein, 2000)
  (1997)
  (1997)
  (1997)
 Nabuli Tintin (1999)
 Picturesque Sceneries: The Musical Journey Of Anna And Her Magical Flute (2005)
 Sarabanda (2010)
 WTC –  (on the occasion of 11 September 2001)

Theatre music 
 Marat/Sade (1996)
  [Requiem for a spy] (1994)
  (2003)

Improvisations 
  (2009)
  No. 1 (1999)
  [Mirror in the mirror] (2008)
  [Dance on the volcano] (2006)

References

External links 

 Homepage of Hans-Joachim Hessler
 Dr. Hans-Joachim Heßler, Hochschule für Musik Detmold

1968 births
Living people
German composers
German musicologists
People from Duisburg
People from Recklinghausen